Aliya Hamza Malik  is a Pakistani politician was a member of the National Assembly of Pakistan since August 2018 till 17 January 2023. Her resignation was accepted by speaker National Assembly in January 2023 to ward off any risk of PTI returning to National Assembly.

Political career

She was elected to the National Assembly of Pakistan as a candidate of Pakistan Tehreek-e-Insaf (PTI) on a reserved seat for women from Punjab in 2018 Pakistani general election.

On 27 September 2018, Prime Minister Imran Khan appointed her as Federal Parliamentary Secretary for Textile.

See also
 List of members of the 15th National Assembly of Pakistan
 List of Pakistan Tehreek-e-Insaf elected members (2013–2018)

External links

References

Date of birth missing (living people)
Living people
Punjabi people
Women members of the National Assembly of Pakistan
Pakistani MNAs 2018–2023
Pakistan Tehreek-e-Insaf MNAs
Year of birth missing (living people)
21st-century Pakistani women politicians